St Asaph ("church on the Elwy") is a city and community on the River Elwy in Denbighshire, Wales. In the 2011 Census it had a population of 3,355, making it the second-smallest city in Britain in terms of population and urban area. It is in the historic county of Flintshire.

The city of St Asaph is surrounded by countryside and views of the Vale of Clwyd. It is situated close to a number of busy coastal towns such as Rhyl, Prestatyn, Abergele, Colwyn Bay and Llandudno. The historic castles of Denbigh and Rhuddlan are also nearby

History
The earliest inhabitants of the vale of Elwy lived at the nearby Paleolithic site of Pontnewydd (Bontnewydd), which was excavated from 1978 by a team from the University of Wales, led by Stephen Aldhouse Green. Teeth and part of a jawbone excavated in 1981 were dated to 225,000 years ago. This site is the most north-western site in Eurasia for remains of early hominids and is considered of international importance. Based on the morphology and age of the teeth, particularly the evidence of taurodontism, the teeth are believed to belong to a group of Neanderthals who hunted game in the vale of Elwy in an interglacial period.

Later some historians postulate that the Roman fort of Varae sat on the site of the cathedral. However, the city is believed to have developed around a sixth-century Celtic monastery founded by Saint Kentigern, and is now home to the small 14th century St Asaph Cathedral. This is dedicated to Saint Asaph (also spelt in Welsh as Asaff), its second bishop.

The cathedral has had a chequered history. In the 13th century, the troops of Edward I of England burnt the cathedral almost to the ground, and in 1402 Owain Glyndŵr's troops went on the rampage, causing severe damage to the furnishings and fittings. Two hundred and fifty years later, during the Commonwealth, the building was used to house farm animals: pigs, cattle and horses.

The Laws in Wales Act 1535 placed St Asaph in Denbighshire. However, in 1542 St Asaph was placed in Flintshire for voting purposes. Between 1 April 1974 and 1 April 1996 it was part of non-metropolitan Clwyd.

City status

As the seat of a medieval cathedral and diocese, St Asaph was historically regarded as a city, and the 1911 Encyclopædia Britannica refers to it as a city on that basis; however the UK government clarified that St Asaph was previously the only one of the twenty two ancient cathedral dioceses in England and Wales (pre-Reformation) not to have been awarded city status. The town applied for the status in competitions held by the British government in 2000 (for the Millennium) and 2002 (Queen's Golden Jubilee) but was unsuccessful. In 2012 it again competed for city status during the Queen's Diamond Jubilee celebrations. It was announced on 14 March 2012 that the application was successful, and city status was to be bestowed upon St Asaph alongside Chelmsford and Perth. The status was formally granted by letters patent dated 1 June 2012.

The award of city status is typically granted to a local authority, whose administrative area is then considered to be the formal borders of the city. By this definition, the whole community area of St Asaph is considered to be the extent of the city, including its urban and rural areas.

Community
Despite the previous lack of official city status, the community council had referred to itself as the City of St Asaph Town Council. The local community is passionate about St Asaph's historic claim to be known as a city like its Welsh cousin St Davids, which has led to a number of local businesses using 'City' as part of their business name. The city is promoted locally as the "City of Music".

The past few decades have seen the local economy in St Asaph thrive, first with the opening of the A55 road in 1970, which took east–west traffic away from the city, and, more recently, with a business park being built, attracting investment from home and overseas.

The crowded roads in St Asaph have been a hot political issue for many years. In recent years, increasing volumes of traffic on the A525, St Asaph High Street, which links A55 with the Clwyd Valley, Denbigh and Ruthin, have led to severe congestion in the city. This congestion is having a detrimental effect on the city, and residents have repeatedly called for a bypass to take this north–south road and its traffic away from the city, but the National Assembly for Wales rejected these calls in 2004, presenting a further setback for residents campaigning on the issue.

St Asaph is now home to Ysgol Glan Clwyd, a Welsh medium secondary school that opened in Rhyl in 1956 and moved to St Asaph in 1969. It was the first Welsh medium secondary school in Wales.

An original copy of the Welsh Bible is kept on public display in St Asaph Cathedral. It was used at the investiture of Prince Charles as Prince of Wales in 1969.

Twinning
St Asaph is twinned with the town of Bégard in Brittany, France.

Festivities
Every year the city hosts the North Wales International Music Festival, which takes place at several venues in the city and attracts musicians and music lovers from all over Wales and beyond. In past years, the main event in September at the cathedral has been covered on television by the BBC.

Other annual events in the city include the increasingly popular Woodfest Wales crafts festival in June, the Beat the Bounds charity walk in July and the Gala Day in August.

Churches
In addition to the cathedral, there are five other churches in St Asaph covering all the major Christian denominations. The Parish Church of St Asaph and St Kentigern (Church in Wales) is placed prominently at the bottom of the High Street, across the river in Lower Denbigh Road is Penniel Chapel (Welsh Methodist) and halfway up the High Street there is Llanelwy Community Church (Baptist). At the top of the city, in Chester Street is St Winifride's (Roman Catholic) and Bethlehem Chapel (Welsh Presbyterian) in Bronwylfa Square.

Governance
The City Council comprises two wards that both elect seven councillors. The presiding officer and chairperson of the council is The Rt Wp The Mayor Cllr Colin Hardie.

In the 2022 local elections, St Asaph elected the first Green Party councillor in Denbighshire in the St Asaph East electoral ward.

Transport
St. Asaph is served by regular buses to Denbigh, Rhuddlan and Rhyl. The city was once served by a station on the Vale of Clwyd Railway line, which closed in the 1960s. However, the station remains and the site is now in use as a timber yard. The nearest stations are now in Rhyl and Pensarn.

Although further away, other stations in the vicinity of the city include Flint, Shotton, Wrexham and Ruabon. Llangollen Railway is also a nearby tourist attraction in nearby Corwen, as is Bala Lake Railway in the town of Bala.

Notable people
See :Category:People from St Asaph

A number of famous people have strong links to St Asaph, having been born, raised, lived, worked or died in the city. These include:
William Morgan (1545–1604), translated the Bible into Welsh, later Lord Bishop of St Asaph
Georgiana Hare-Naylor (ca. 1755–1806) an English painter and art patron.
Dic Aberdaron (1780–1843), traveller and polyglot who taught himself Latin at the age of 11
Felicia Hemans (1793–1835), poet, wrote the poem Casabianca with The boy stood on the burning deck.
G. W. Hemans (1814–1885), architect and engineer, engineered the Vale of Clwyd Railway line through St Asaph
Sir Henry Morton Stanley, GCB (1841–1904), explorer and journalist.
Dr. A. G. Edwards, (1848–1937),  Lord Bishop of St Asaph the first Lord Archbishop of Wales in the Church in Wales
Felix Powell (1878–1942), British Army Staff Sergeant wrote the music to Pack Up Your Troubles in Your Old Kit Bag
George Henry Powell (1880–1951), songwriter wrote the lyrics to Pack Up Your Troubles in Your Old Kit Bag
William Mathias CBE (1934–1992), composer of choral works, lived and buried in St Asaph.
Geoffrey James (born 1942), Canadian photographer
Gareth Jones (born 1961), television presenter
Dr Antony John Williams (born 1964), chemist, science-blogger and author
Prof. Russell Morris (born 1967), Professor of Chemistry at the University of St Andrews and former first-class cricketer
Carl Sargeant (1968–2017), Welsh politician
Greg Davies (born 1968), comedian, presenter, actor and writer
Steve Williams (born 1971), keyboard player, founder of Power Quest and former member of DragonForce
Spencer Wilding (born 1972), actor and stunt performer
Richard Ian Cox (born 1973), Vancouver-based voice actor and online radio host
Lisa Scott-Lee (born 1975), singer, member of Steps
Paul Mealor (born 1975), composer, much of his output is for chorus
Dr James Davies (born 1980), Conservative Party politician and MP for the Vale of Clwyd
Bryan Parry (born 1992), actor

Sport 

Alan Rudkin (1941–2010), British, Commonwealth and European bantamweight boxing champion
Brynley Jones (born 1959), footballer with over 190 club caps
Ian Rush MBE (born 1961), footballer, former Wales captain and 199 goals for Liverpool
Barry Horne (born 1962), footballer with over 540 club caps and 59 for Wales 
Paul Affleck (born 1966), professional golfer who has played on the European Tour
Darren Owen (born 1967), horse racing commentator.
David Harrison (born 1972), jockey, winner of 1992 Royal Hunt Cup at Royal Ascot
Rob Higgitt (born 1981), rugby union player
Eifion Lewis-Roberts (born 1981), rugby union prop forward
Becky Brewerton(born 1982), golfer on the Ladies European Tour
Mark Webster (born 1983), former professional darts player
Pat Leach (born 1985), rugby union player for Newport RFC and the Newport Gwent Dragons regional team
Andy Fenby (born 1985), former rugby union footballer 
Victoria Thornley (born 1987), rower, team silver medalist in the women's double sculls at the 2016 Summer Olympics.
Neil Taylor (born 1989), footballer, with 338 club caps and 43 for Wales international and Team GB squad member for the London 2012 Olympics
Dyddgu Hywel (born 1989), rugby union fullback for the Gloucester Hartpury and Wales women
Chris Maxwell (born 1990), football goalkeeper with over 400 club caps and captain of Blackpool
Rebecca Chin (born 1991), athlete, silver medalist at the 2015 World Rowing Championships and represented Great Britain in discus and shot put at the 2008 Summer Paralympics

Another well-known individual, Geoffrey of Monmouth, served as Lord Bishop of St Asaph from 1152 to 1155. However, due to war and unrest in Wales at the time, he probably never set foot in his see.

The hospital in the city (formerly the St Asaph Union Workhouse) was named H.M. Stanley Hospital in honour of Sir Henry Morton Stanley; it closed in 2012. The city's hospice was named after Saint Kentigern.

References

Notes

Bibliography
T.W. Pritchard St Asaph Cathedral R J L Smith Much Wenlock (1997) 
Dr Chis Stringer Homo Brittanicus 319 pages, publisher: Allen Lane (5 October 2006) ,

External links

St Asaph City Council
St Asaph (City Times)
BBC St Asaph page
North Wales International Music Festival
www.geograph.co.uk : photos of St Asaph and surrounding area

 
Cities in Wales
Towns in Denbighshire
Communities in Denbighshire